Michael Dwain DeJean (born September 28, 1970) is a former right-handed relief pitcher in Major League Baseball.

Career
DeJean played shortstop during his college career at Mississippi Delta Community College and Livingston University. In , while playing for Livingston in the Division II College World Series, DeJean pitched to two batters, retiring both. He was selected in the 24th round of the 1992 amateur draft by the New York Yankees and signed to a professional contract as a pitcher.

The Yankees traded DeJean to the Colorado Rockies for Joe Girardi after the 1995 season. He made his major league debut on May 2, pitching a scoreless inning in relief against the Philadelphia Phillies. He was named National League Player of the Week for May 26 through June 1, . He was traded to the New York Mets during the 2004 season, but was released in June . With the Mets, DeJean posted 3–1 record and 6.31 ERA. In July 2005, DeJean signed with the Rockies, re-joining the team that he began his career with in 1997. With the Rockies, DeJean posted 2–3 record and 3.19 ERA in 38 games, all in relief.

On October 27, 2005, the Rockies announced they signed DeJean to a one-year contract, guaranteeing him $1.3 million ($1.15 million in base salary and $150,000 on a mutual option of $1.5 million salary in ). He appeared in 20 games for AAA Colorado Springs Sky Sox on an injury rehab assignment, but was released before making an appearance with the major league club. After signing a minor league contract with the Houston Astros during the 2007-2008 off-season, Dejean was released before appearing in a game.

DeJean is married with two children and resides in West Monroe, Louisiana.

References

External links

1970 births
Living people
Albany-Colonie Yankees players
American expatriate baseball players in Mexico
Baltimore Orioles players
Baseball players from Baton Rouge, Louisiana
Colorado Rockies players
Colorado Springs Sky Sox players
Greensboro Hornets players
Guerreros de Oaxaca players
Major League Baseball pitchers
Mexican League baseball pitchers
Milwaukee Brewers players
Mississippi Delta Trojans baseball players
New Haven Ravens players
New York Mets players
Norwich Navigators players
Oneonta Yankees players
St. Louis Cardinals players
Tampa Yankees players
Tulsa Drillers players